Cheyenne High School may refer to:

Cheyenne High School (North Las Vegas, Nevada)
Cheyenne High School (Cheyenne, Wyoming), former high school, listed on the National Register of Historic Places
Cheyenne Central High School, Cheyenne, Wyoming
Cheyenne East High School, Cheyenne, Wyoming
Cheyenne South High School, Cheyenne, Wyoming
Cheyenne Mountain High School, Colorado Springs, Colorado
Cheyenne Mountain Charter Academy, Colorado Springs, Colorado